Warp Records (or simply Warp) is a British independent record label founded in Sheffield in 1989 by record store employees Steve Beckett and Rob Mitchell and record producer Robert Gordon. It is currently based in London.

In the early 1990s, the label initially became associated with the UK's northern bleep techno scene, including acts such as LFO, Sweet Exorcist, Forgemasters and Nightmares on Wax. The 1992 label compilation Artificial Intelligence helped establish the electronic subgenre known as intelligent dance music (IDM). Subsequently, Warp became the home of influential acts such as Aphex Twin, Autechre, Squarepusher, and Boards of Canada. Current artists signed to the label include Flying Lotus, Oneohtrix Point Never, Danny Brown, Brian Eno, Hudson Mohawke, Kelela and Yves Tumor.

In 2004, Warp opened the online store Bleep.com, which sells downloadable music free of digital rights management (DRM) features.

History

1989–1991: Bleep techno

Warp was founded amidst the development of Northern England's "bleep techno" scene, often characterized as the first uniquely British rave style. While drawing influence from American techno and house, bleep artists also utilized electro-style synthesizer sounds and unusually heavy bass. In addition to its simple synth tones (the eponymous "bleeps"), sub-bass inspired by reggae sound systems, and sparse instrumentation, bleep techno also utilised breakbeat-inspired drum machine patterns.

Warp was opened in 1989 by Steve Beckett and the late Rob Mitchell, who had both gained experience working at Sheffield's FON record shop, alongside record producer Robert Gordon. The name was chosen because the original name, 'Warped Records', was difficult to distinguish over the telephone. The first release (WAP1) was by Forgemasters (produced by Robert Gordon), whose 500 copy pressing of "Track with no Name" was financed by an Enterprise Allowance grant and distributed in a borrowed car. It set a trend for the early releases both in terms of sound, and the use of purple sleeves (designed by the Designers Republic). The follow-up was Nightmares on Wax's "Dextrous", which sold around 30,000 copies. This led to greater commercial success; by its fifth release the label had its first Top 20 chart entry with LFO and their eponymous single, "LFO", which sold 130,000 copies and peaked at No. 12 in the UK Singles Chart in July 1990; by coincidence, that same month another Warp act, Tricky Disco, reached No. 14 in the UK chart with another eponymous single, "Tricky Disco".

Warp's third record, "Testone" (1990) by Sweet Exorcist (Richard H. Kirk and Richard Barratt), defined Sheffield's bleep techno sound, by making playful use of sampled sounds from Yellow Magic Orchestra's "Computer Game" (1978) and the film Close Encounters of the Third Kind (1977). The first album released was Sweet Exorcist's C.C.E.P. in 1991. In the same year Robert Gordon left Warp acrimoniously.

1992–1999: Artificial Intelligence
Warp went on to release a series of singles and albums from 1992 under the Artificial Intelligence heading, a series of experimental electronic music releases by artists such as Aphex Twin (as Diceman and later Polygon Window), Autechre, B12, the Black Dog, Richie Hawtin and Alex Paterson (of the Orb). Initially all the album releases used gatefold sleeves and coloured vinyl, often designed by the Designers Republic or Phil Wolstenholme. A VHS compilation of digitally animated music videos called Motion was released in conjunction with the second Artificial Intelligence compilation, and featured an early work by director David Slade. 

In 1996, Warp started the Blech club night in Sheffield, also in London between 1997 and 1999, and released an accompanying compilation CD under the same name. The artwork, created by the Designers Republic, had a distinctive Japanese manga influence. Blech club nights include:
 Blech01 (31 Oct 1997): Seefeel with Boards of Canada
 Blech 02 (28 Nov 1997): Autechre with Cylob
 Blech 03 (30 Jan 1998): Plone

In 1998, Warp signed Boards of Canada, a duo that would go on to release some of the most highly revered electronic music albums of their time: Music Has the Right to Children (1998), Geogaddi (2002), The Campfire Headphase (2005) and Tomorrow's Harvest (2013).

In 1999, the label released Warp 10: Influences, Classics, Remixes, a compilation spanning six discs, featuring early acid house and techno music that influenced the label and its artists, as well as tracks from Warp's back catalogue, and new remixes of Warp material. The collection celebrated the label's tenth anniversary.

2000–2009 
In 2000, the label moved its operations to London along with its physical music and merchandise store Warpmart.

Co-founder Rob Mitchell was diagnosed with cancer in early 2001. He died later that year, aged 38.

In January 2004, Warp launched an online digital music and entertainment store, Bleep.com, notable for being the first store in the world to completely avoid all digital rights management features in the downloadable tracks, unlike other music stores such as iTunes and Rhapsody. Warpmart has now been absorbed into Bleep.com. Today Bleep sells a carefully curated selection of music from a diverse range of labels. The site has also released its own limited edition LPs The Green Series, and an annual digital release comprising the Top 100 tracks of each year.

On 27 September 2004, Warp released its second music video compilation, named WarpVision, featuring most of the videos produced from 1989 to 2004.

2005 saw the release of Warp, the first book in the Labels Unlimited series. Written by Rob Young, the book gave an illustrated history of the label, as well as offering a complete discography. The Warp website said the book was "A very beautiful thing and like our very own This Is Your Life", referring to the This Is Your Life UK TV series.

The label continued to expand its roster, signing acts including !!!, Battles, Born Ruffians, Maxïmo Park, Gravenhurst and Grizzly Bear.

For the label's 20th anniversary in 2009, several Warp20 concerts took place in Paris, New York City, Sheffield, Tokyo, Berlin and London. Warp also celebrated by releasing the Warp20 box set, composed of six parts:
 Warp20 (1989-2009) The Complete Catalogue: a 192-page book of artwork from every Warp release since the label began.
 Warp20 (Chosen): a double CD album, with ten songs chosen by Warp fans and ten chosen by founder Steve Beckett
 Warp20 (Recreated): a double CD album that included twenty brand new cover versions of Warp songs by Warp artists past and present
 Warp20 (Unheard): a triple 10" vinyl set of unheard tracks from artists such as Boards Of Canada, Autechre and Broadcast.
 Warp20 (Elemental): a CD album featuring an hour-long piece by Osymyso, made from sections, samples and fragments of Warp music from the previous twenty years.
 Warp20 (Infinite): a double 10" vinyl of loops from Warp tracks.

2010–present 
Warp continued to release albums, from artists such as Hudson Mohawke, Flying Lotus, Mark Pritchard, Bibio, Jamie Lidell, Lonelady, Leila, and Gonjasufi. Signings included Brian Eno, Oneohtrix Point Never, Mount Kimbie, Kwes., Darkstar, Kelela, patten and Jeremiah Jae.

2013 saw the release of Broadcast's album Berberian Sound Studio, the soundtrack to the film of the same name. Warp released a split remix 12" for Record Store Day, which was a collaboration between Brian Eno, Nicolas Jaar and Grizzly Bear. In March, Autechre broadcast two 10-hour radio shows to celebrate the release of their 11th album, Exai. Boards of Canada's fourth studio album Tomorrow's Harvest charted worldwide, reaching number 7 in the UK Albums Chart, and number 13 in the US Billboard 200 – vinyl reissues of their albums and EPs followed in October and November. Nightmares on Wax (George Evelyn) released his first album in five years, entitled Feelin' Good, and followed this with one of his biggest ever international tours, with a live band.

In 2013, Warp also won Independent Label Of The Year at the AIM Awards. In October of that year, to coincide with the Universal Everything & You - Drawing in Motion exhibition running at the National Media Museum's Media Space at Science Museum, London, a 20-minute piece created by Simon Pyke (Freeform), built upon the foundations of the exhibition soundtrack, was released. In December 2013 Warp collaborated with Tate Britain to present a free evening of performance and installations, Warp x Tate, alongside artist Jeremy Deller, inspired by Deller's work 'The History of the World', with contributions from Oneohtrix Point Never, Patten, Darkstar, Hudson Mohawke and Rustie.

In 2019, Warp celebrated their 30th anniversary (stylized as WXAXRXP, a combination of WARP and the roman numeral for 30 (XXX)) with 3 days straight of broadcasts on NTS Radio featuring old radio performances by various artists (as well as a few new ones). In addition Warp released a 10 EP set (vinyl-only) of 20 minute radio sessions, featuring (among other things) Aphex Twin's 1995 Peel Session and a version Boards of Canada's 2001 Peel Session that included the final track ("XYZ", which was cut from almost all previous releases of the EP).

Music videos 
Warp has released a number of ground-breaking and original videos that have launched their directors' careers. Much of these videos were compiled for the 2004 WarpVision: The Videos 1989-2004 DVD.

Pulp frontman Jarvis Cocker directed some of Warp's earliest videos while at London's Central Saint Martins art school, including LFO's eponymous "LFO" in 1990, Nightmares On Wax's "Aftermath" in 1991, and Aphex Twin's 1993 single "On".

Chris Cunningham is a frequent collaborator with Warp artists. He has directed videos for Aphex Twin's 1997 single "Come to Daddy" and 1999's "Windowlicker", as well as "Come On My Selector" by Squarepusher and "Second Bad Vilbel" by Autechre. "Come To Daddy" was chosen by Pitchfork as the best video of the 1990s, and "Windowlicker" was nominated for Best British Video at the 2000 Brit Awards. Cunningham's short film Rubber Johnny, soundtracked by Aphex Twin, was distributed by Warp Films in 2005.

In 2013, Kahlil Joseph's short film for Flying Lotus' "Until The Quiet Comes" won a Short Film Special Jury Award at the 2013 Sundance Film Festival and Video of the Year at the 2013 UK Music Video Awards. On 12 April, Adam Buxton hosted BUG: Warp Records Special at the BFI Southbank, London, as part of Warp Films' 10th Anniversary.

Artists past and present

Warp subsidiaries and partnerships
Warp launched a film company, Warp Films (which also shares staff with Warp X) and digital download store Bleep in 2004. Bleep carries music from a number of smaller labels as well as Warp. In 2009, Warpmart was incorporated into Bleep, which now sells downloads, physical releases and merchandise from hundreds of record labels. Bleep also operates a record imprint of Warp.

A number of music sub labels have also been set up by Warp, namely Lex Records (now operates independently from Warp), Gift Records and Arcola.

Warp assists in the distribution of certain records released by LuckyMe and Night Slugs/Fade To Mind; the aforementioned labels are partner labels (not imprints) of Warp.

Selected discography

Artificial Intelligence Series
 Artificial Intelligence (WARP 6, 1992)
 Polygon Window – Surfing On Sine Waves (WARP 7, 1992)
 Black Dog Productions – Bytes (WARP 8, 1993)
 B12 – Electro-Soma (WARP 9, 1993)
 FUSE – Dimension Intrusion (WARP 12, 1993)
 Speedy J – Ginger (WARP 14, 1993)
 Autechre – Incunabula (WARP 17, 1993)
 Artificial Intelligence II (WARP 23, 1994)

Compilation albums

See also
 List of record labels
 List of electronic music record labels
 List of independent UK record labels
 Intelligent dance music

Notes

References

External links
 – official site
 – official site (a now independent abstract hip-hop label that branched off from Warp)

Warp feature story in Guardian Music Weekly
 A Warped Mind : Steve Beckett On Running A Label Legend - [PIAS]'s Blog, 27 January 2015

Electronic music record labels
British independent record labels
Music in Sheffield
Record labels established in 1989